NGC 4474 is an edge-on lenticular galaxy located about 50 million light-years away in the constellation Coma Berenices. NGC 4474 was discovered by astronomer William Herschel on April 8, 1784. It is a member of the Virgo Cluster.

See also
 List of NGC objects (4001–5000)

References

External links

Lenticular galaxies
Coma Berenices
4474
41241
7634
Astronomical objects discovered in 1784
Virgo Cluster